A body farm is a research facility where human decomposition is studied.

It may also refer to:
 The Body Farm (novel), a crime fiction novel by Patricia Cornwell
 The Body Farm (TV series), a BBC police procedural crime drama
 The University of Tennessee Anthropological Research Facility, popularly known as the Body Farm
 "Body Farm", a song by the deathgrind band Cattle Decapitation
 Bodyfarm, a Dutch Death Metal band